The Gate of Heavenly Purity (Manchu:  kiyan cing men) is the main gate of the Inner Court of the Forbidden City, in Beijing, China. The gate once led people to Forbidden City's residential quarters. It is connected to the Palace of Heavenly Purity, and near the Gate of Thriving Imperial Clan.

Two gilded Chinese lion sculptures are installed outside the gate.

References

External links
 

Forbidden City
Gates of Beijing